Abdulrahman bin Abdulaziz Al Kelya is the Chief Justice of the Supreme Court of Saudi Arabia.

Career
Al Kelya has served as a judge in various Saudi courts for 40 years, including as Chief Judge in the Court of Cassation in Mecca. In 2009, he was described in an article in Arab News as "one of the most experienced personalities in the field of Saudi law".

Appointment as Chief Justice
In February 2009, Al Kelya was appointed as Chief Justice of the Supreme Court. The Supreme Court was created by King Abdullah as part of his wide-ranging judicial reforms announced in 2007, and Al Kelya was the first Chief Justice to be appointed. His appointment was one of a number of changes to the judiciary intended to create a court system more in line with international practices.

See also 
Legal system of Saudi Arabia

References 

Saudi Arabian scholars
Sunni Muslim scholars of Islam
Sharia judges
Saudi Arabian Sunni Muslims